Lieutenant-General Charles Boye served in the Bombay Army, was commander in chief in Bombay from 1815 to 24 February 1816. Enlisted in 1776 as a cadet, and returned to England in 1820, was promoted from major general to lieutenant general in 1821.

Footnotes

References

Year of birth missing
Year of death missing
Commanders-in-chief of Bombay
British East India Company Army generals